Altona City SC is an Australian all-inclusive association football (soccer) club from Altona, Victoria, a suburb of Melbourne, Victoria. The club was formed in 1965 with four fundamental countries contributing it its establishment and growth - England, Scotland, Malta and The Netherlands.The club played in the Victorian State League from 1977 to 1981.

In the 2000s the club then come one of the heavy hitters in women's soccer having a team in the WPL,  The club's most notable alumni include Socceroos great Alan Edward Davidson and current Socceroo Jason Davidson. The club has produced many Socceroos and is one of major development clubs in Victoria.

•	Alan Davidson - A former Australian Association football player / Nottingham Forest FC 84-85 / Padang FA Malaysia 1992 - voted the league's best player / Three World Cups / 1988 Seoul Olympics / Socceroo Captain / Football Hall of Fame 2001 / Named in Australia's Best 11 ever Socceroo Team in 2012 
•	Jason Davidson - Professional player for Ulsan Hyundai 2019  / Perth Glory 2018 - 2019 / Australian U20 squad 2009 / World Cup 2014 / AFC Asian Cup 2015 
•	Peter Laumets 1 Cap GK
•	Vlado Bozinovski U23 x 3 / Full Caps x 6 1 Goal / Seoul Olympics 1988
•	John Little – U20 Australia
•	Steve Laurie – Joey's Australia U17's
•	Colin Cooper- Joey's Australia U17's
•	Melindaj Barbieri - Melbourne Victory Player / Represent Australia in the Australian Women's National U20 Soccer Team 
•	Tony Cassar - Order of Australia

Recent History
The club was in financial ruins in 2013 with several former players led by Joe Tanti and Sam Borg pulled the club back from the brink of closing its doors. After achieving promotion in the 2015 season, Altona City appointed Andy O'Dell as head coach for the remainder of the 2016 season, eventually finishing the season in third place.

In 2017, City won the Victorian State League Division 2 North-West championship and subsequent promotion. Ayodeji Omoboye won the club's golden boot with 17 goals and was runner-up in the league golden boot. After the conclusion of the 2017 season, head coach Andy O'Dell announced his resignation and the job was handed to Paul Donnelly.

In 2018, Altona City consolidated its position in Victorian State League Division 1 with a ninth-place finish.

After the disruption of COVID, the committee of Altona City Soccer Club is focused and committed to success both on and off the pitch in 2022. This includes the appointment of new Senior Men's Coach, Michael Calandrella and Senior Women's Coach Gustavo Flores and together with Hobsons Bay City Council the development of new clubrooms at HC Kim Reserve.

Current squad
Senior Men's Team 2021

Senior Women's Team 2021

References

External links
Altona City SC OzFootball Page

Association football clubs established in 1965
Soccer clubs in Melbourne
1965 establishments in Australia
Victorian State League teams
Sport in the City of Hobsons Bay